The Orange Billboard is the Moonbabies second full-length album, released in 2004. Under the Radar Magazine, in September 2014, stating that The Orange Billboard “...still stands as one of the best albums the genre may have ever seen.”

Track listing 
 Fieldtrip USA - 4:50
 Sun A.M. - 5:26
 Over My Head - 3:47
 Crime o' the Moon - 3:54
 Jets - 3:51
 Summer Kids Go - 5:02
 Forever Changes Everything Now - 5:10
 Slowmono - 4:28
 Wyomi - 1:42
 The Orange Billboard - 7:07
 You Know How It Is - 3:00

References 

2004 albums